East of Eden's Gate is a studio album by singer Billy Thorpe. It was released in 1982 by Pasha Records. The singles were "Hold On to Your Dream" and "No Show Tonight". The album was remastered in 2013 by Rock Candy Records.

Track listing

References

Billy Thorpe albums
1982 albums
Pasha Records albums
Albums produced by Spencer Proffer